In rhetoric, meiosis is a euphemistic figure of speech that intentionally understates something or implies that it is lesser in significance or size than it really is. Meiosis is the opposite of auxesis, and is often compared to litotes. The term is derived from the Greek  (“to make smaller”, "to diminish").

Examples

Historical examples
"(Our) peculiar institution", for slavery and its economic ramifications in the American South.
 "The Recent Unpleasantness", used in the 19th century in the southern United States as an idiom to refer to the American Civil War and its aftermath.
"The Emergency", a term used in the Republic of Ireland for the conflict that the rest of the world called the Second World War.
In the Hirohito surrender broadcast, the Japanese emperor said that "the war situation has developed not necessarily to Japan's advantage", a week after the atomic bombings of Hiroshima and Nagasaki. (The original Classical Japanese)
"The Troubles",  a name for decades of violence in Northern Ireland.

Other examples
"The Pond", for the Atlantic Ocean ("across the pond"). Similarly, "The Ditch" for the Tasman Sea, between Australia and New Zealand.
"The outback"; under its original etymology in the late 19th century, this was a meiosis comparison between the vast empty regions of central Australia and the backyard of a house; but its usage today is so common and so far distanced from its etymology that the meiosis effect has been lost.
In The Catcher in the Rye by J. D. Salinger, Holden Caulfield says "It isn't very serious. I have this tiny little tumor on the brain."
"Intolerable meiosis!" comments a character in William Golding's Fire Down Below as their ship encounters an iceberg after another character comments, "We are privileged. How many people have seen anything like this?"

See also
English understatement
Euphemism
Figure of speech
Hyperbole
Paradiastole

Notes

References
 

Figures of speech
Rhetorical techniques

ru:Литота#Троп преуменьшения